Despise (adjective form: despicable) means to regard with contempt or scorn.

Despise or Despicable may also refer to:

 "Despicable" (song), a 2010 freestyle by Eminem
 "Despicable" (EP), a 2020 EP by death metal band Carcass
 '"Despise'" (Slipknot song), a 1999 song by metal band Slipknot

See also 
 
 
 Despised (Seaweed (band) album)